Stenotosauridae is an extinct family of mastodonsauroid temnospondyls. It has included genera such as Stenotosaurus, Wellesaurus, and Procyclotosaurus.

References

Triassic temnospondyls
Triassic first appearances
Triassic extinctions